Melchor Maldonado y Saavedra, O.S.A. (1588–1662) was a Roman Catholic prelate who served as Bishop of Córdoba (1635–1662).

Biography
Melchor Maldonado y Saavedra was born in Río de la Hacha in 1588 and ordained a priest in the Order of Saint Augustine.
On 20 September 1631, he was selected as Bishop of Córdoba and confirmed by Pope Urban VIII on 8 March 1632.
In 1633, he was consecrated bishop by Hernando de Arias y Ugarte, Archbishop of Lima. 
He was installed on 27 June 1635.
He served as Bishop of Córdoba until his death on 11 February 1662. 
While bishop, he was the principal consecrator of Bernardino de Cárdenas Ponce, Bishop of Paraguay (1641); and the principal co-consecrator of Pedro de Villagómez Vivanco, Bishop of Arequipa (1633).

References 

17th-century Roman Catholic bishops in Argentina
Bishops appointed by Pope Urban VIII
1588 births
1662 deaths
Augustinian bishops
Roman Catholic bishops of Córdoba